The Table Tennis tournament of the 2009 Lusophony Games was played in Pavilhão Atlântico, Lisbon, Portugal. The tournament was played from 12 to 13 July 2009, and there was both the men's and women's competition with singles, doubles, and mixed doubles.

Medal summary

Male Singles

Female Singles

Team competition – Male

First round

Group A

Group B

Semi-finals

Finals

Team competition – Female

First round

See also
ACOLOP
Lusophony Games
2009 Lusophony Games

2009 Lusofonia Games
Table tennis at the Lusofonia Games
2009 in table tennis